Olivia Tapiero (born March 11, 1990) is a Canadian writer from Montreal, Quebec. She is most noted for her novels Les Murs, which won the Prix Robert-Cliche in 2009, and Rien du tout, which was shortlisted for the Governor General's Award for French-language fiction at the 2021 Governor General's Awards.

References

1990 births
Living people
21st-century Canadian novelists
21st-century Canadian women writers
Canadian women novelists
Canadian novelists in French
Writers from Montreal